Muri-ye Ajam (also Romanized as Mūrī-ye Ājam) is a village in Ajam Rural District, Dishmok District, Kohgiluyeh County, Kohgiluyeh and Boyer-Ahmad Province, Iran. At the 2006 census, its population was 65, in 11 families.

References 

Populated places in Kohgiluyeh County